Lili Bech (born Lily Beck; 29 December 1883 – 20 January 1939) was a Danish silent film actress. She appeared in 27 films between 1911 and 1917. She was married to film director Victor Sjöström.

Selected filmography
 The Gardener (1912)
 Children of the Streets (1914)
 Daughter of the Peaks (1914)
 Guilt Redeemed (1915)
 The Wings (1916)
 The Ships That Meet (1916)
 Therèse (1916)

External links

1883 births
1939 deaths
Danish silent film actresses
20th-century Danish actresses